Francis Guy (1885 – 27 October 1947) was a British cyclist. He competed in two events at the 1912 Summer Olympics.

References

External links
 

1885 births
1947 deaths
British male cyclists
Olympic cyclists of Great Britain
Cyclists at the 1912 Summer Olympics
Sportspeople from Belfast